4KQ is a commercial radio station in Brisbane, Australia owned by Sports Entertainment Network (SEN).

History
Planning for the station began after a licence with the callsign 4KQ was granted in August 1946. It began broadcasting on 7 May 1947 on 650 kHz under the ownership of the Australian Labor Party. The station was involved in number of controversies relating to this ownership.

On 1 September 1948, the station changed to 690 kHz, although was marketed in the 1970s and 1980s as 4KQ 700. Originally transmitting with 1,000 watts at launch, approval was given to upgrade to 2000W in April 1954.

In 1978 the station moved to 693 kHz. In 1980, Michael Edgley, Col Joye and Michael Willesee purchased a combined 48.5% shareholding. In 1986, 4KQ was purchased by Wesgo.

4KQ broadcasts from Brisbane suburb of Milton, after moving with its sister station 97.3 FM from Stones Corner in 2020. It presented a classic hits format of music from the 1960s, 1970s and 1980s, with some 1990s, aimed at listeners 40–54 years of age.

Sale to SEN and rebrand 
Following its purchase of Grant Broadcasters in November 2021, Here, There & Everywhere announced its intention to sell the station to comply with Australian Communications & Media Authority regulations that limit the number of radio stations an owner can have in one city. In May 2022, Sports Entertainment Network purchased the station.

Following the sale, SEN announced a rebrand to 693 SENQ and a programming change to "constant sporting content" as  "Queensland's only dedicated sports station". On 30 June 2022 the station's former format ended, ending the long running service of breakfast announcers Laurel Edwards (30 years), Gary Clare (31 years), and Mark Hine (16 years).

Programming
4KQ's main programming component was formerly classic hits music. News Bulletins were also aired hourly weekdays, with an increased half-hourly frequency during the Breakfast programme. Traffic reports were also aired hourly, with an increased 15-minute frequency during the weekday Breakfast programme, and 20-minute frequency during the weekday Drive programme.

References

External links
 
Archived website for 4KQ prior to 2022 sale

Australian Radio Network
Sports radio stations in Australia
Radio stations established in 1947
Radio stations in Brisbane
1947 establishments in Australia